Kyle Mitchell (born February 7, 1983) is a former professional Canadian football defensive end.

He played college football at Indiana State.

He was signed by the Saskatchewan Roughriders as an undrafted free agent in 2006 and played two seasons there, appearing in four games, recording ten tackles, and one fumble recovery.  In his 2nd season with the 'Riders; they won the Grey Cup

He was signed by the BC Lions on January 26, 2009, and released at the end of training camp — June 24, 2009.

References

External links
BC Lions bio

1983 births
Living people
Sportspeople from East Chicago, Indiana
American players of Canadian football
Canadian football defensive linemen
Saskatchewan Roughriders players
BC Lions players
Indiana State Sycamores football players